Thierry Jacot (born 3 December 1961) is a Swiss freestyle swimmer. He competed in two events at the 1984 Summer Olympics.

References

External links
 

1961 births
Living people
Swiss male freestyle swimmers
Olympic swimmers of Switzerland
Swimmers at the 1984 Summer Olympics
Place of birth missing (living people)